Harold Gordon Evans (28 February 1889 – 20 January 1973) was an Australian rules footballer who played with Carlton in the Victorian Football League (VFL).

Notes

External links 

Harold Evans's profile at Blueseum

1889 births
Australian rules footballers from Melbourne
Carlton Football Club players
Australian military personnel of World War I
1973 deaths
People from Parkville, Victoria
Military personnel from Melbourne